= Agnostiko Origins =

Filipino action-platformer video game

Agnostiko ORIGINS
- Unreleased Cover art of Agnostiko ORIGINS
- Developer: Leoned Andrew Tumbaga
- Publisher: Singles Alliance
- Platforms: Nintendo Switch, Xbox One, Xbox Series X/S
- Release: October 27, 2022 (Xbox One); June 14, 2024 (Nintendo Switch); 2026 (re-release)
- Genres: Action-platformer, Metroidvania
- Mode: Single-player

Agnostiko Origins (stylized as Agnostiko ORIGINS) is a Philippine action-platformer video game developed by Leoned Andrew Tumbaga and published by Singles Alliance. The game combines Metroidvania-style exploration with themes inspired by Philippine history, folklore, and mythology.

The game was first released for Xbox platforms in 2022, followed by a Nintendo Switch release in 2024 and a subsequent re-release in 2026.

== Gameplay ==
Agnostiko Origins is a 2D side-scrolling action-platformer incorporating elements commonly associated with the Metroidvania genre. Players explore interconnected environments, acquire new abilities to access previously unreachable areas, engage in combat against enemies, and face boss encounters throughout the game.

== Setting ==
The game is set in a fictionalized version of the Philippines during the late 19th century. Its world incorporates elements drawn from Philippine folklore, mythology, and local cultural traditions, including creatures and themes inspired by regional legends.

== Plot ==
Set in an alternate steampunk-inspired Philippines during the final years of Spanish colonial rule, Agnostiko Origins follows a masked vigilante known as the Red Scarf. Six years after Mr. Plague spread terror across Manila, the mysterious figure returns with an army of monsters and launches an invasion of Intramuros.

As chaos spreads throughout the city, the Red Scarf uncovers a conspiracy involving a prominent imprisoned writer, physician, and reform advocate whose impending execution has drawn the interest of Mr. Plague. Seeking to exploit the prisoner's influence and knowledge through experimentation, Mr. Plague intends to seize him before colonial authorities can carry out the sentence.

Believing that both the invasion and the planned prison break depend upon Mr. Plague's leadership, the Red Scarf embarks on a journey through monster-infested districts, plague-ridden strongholds, and the villain's mysterious mansion. To prevent the prisoner's capture and halt the invasion of Intramuros, he must confront and defeat Mr. Plague, whose command over the invading creatures is central to the scheme.

== Development ==
Agnostiko Origins was developed by Filipino independent game developer Leoned Andrew Tumbaga. According to Inquirer Tech, Tumbaga worked on the game as a largely solo-developed project while drawing inspiration from classic Metroidvania titles and Filipino cultural influences. The project was conceived as a way to combine exploration-focused gameplay with Philippine-inspired storytelling and folklore.

The game's setting evolved from concepts based on Philippine history into a fictional steampunk-inspired world incorporating fantasy and mythology. Development reportedly took place over several years before the game's release on multiple platforms.

== Release ==
The game was initially released digitally for Xbox platforms in October 2022. A Nintendo Switch version followed on June 14, 2024. An updated re-release was subsequently launched in 2026.

== Reception ==
Agnostiko Origins has received coverage from gaming, technology, and lifestyle publications for its incorporation of Filipino culture and mythology.

Switch It On Gaming highlighted the game's retro-inspired presentation, exploration-focused gameplay, and use of Philippine folklore within a Metroidvania framework.

Inquirer Tech described the title as a Filipino-inspired take on the Metroidvania genre and discussed its combination of pixel-art visuals, exploration mechanics, and themes drawn from Philippine culture and mythology. The publication referred to the game as a "Pinoyvania", highlighting its blend of Metroidvania-style gameplay with Philippine-inspired themes.

ABS-CBN Lifestyle included the game in a feature highlighting Filipino-developed indie games that showcase local culture, citing its setting and incorporation of creatures from Philippine folklore.

Game One featured the title in its Filipino Indie Games Showcase, highlighting its alternate-history Philippine setting, folklore-inspired enemies, and retro pixel-art presentation.

Create Philippines profiled the game as a locally developed title drawing inspiration from Philippine history, folklore, and storytelling traditions.
